Satrec Initiative Co., Ltd. (Korean: 쎄트렉아이) or Satrec i or SI is a South Korean satellite manufacturing company headquartered in Daejeon, South Korea The company was founded in 1999 by the engineers who developed the first Korean satellite (KITSAT-1) at KAIST Satellite Technology Research Center (SaTRec). The company designs and builds Earth observation satellites called SpaceEye-series, and it provides various space components, including high resolution electro-optical payloads and star-trackers. SI's first satellite was a Malaysian Earth observation satellite, RazakSAT launched in 2009. SI has two subsidiaries: SI Imaging Services (SIIS) is the exclusive image data provider of KOMPSAT-series, and SI Analytics (SIA) provides AI-native GEOINT solutions for satellite imagery. SI also spun-off SI Detection (SID), which provides radiation monitoring solutions.

History 

Satrec Initiative was founded in Daejeon, South Korea in 1999. There are two subsidiaries established based on SI's business in the remote-sensing satellite. One is SI Imaging Service (SIIS) founded in 2014, and they provide very high resolution optical and SAR images obtained from KOMPSAT-series and DubaiSat-2. Second subsidiary is SI Detection, and they develops and provides state-of-art radiation detectors derived from spacecraft radiation detecting systems.

Satellites and launches 
 KOMPSAT-1 (1999): image receiving and processing station
 STSAT-1 (2003)
 KOMPSAT-2 (2006): image receiving and processing station
 RazakSAT (2009): satellite & ground systems
 DubaiSat-1 (2009): satellite & ground systems 
 COMS-1 (2010): communication payload integration, electrical modules, sun sensor, image receiving and processing station, and mission control subsystems
 RASAT (2011): EO payload & attitude sensors
 X-Sat (2011): EO payload 
 KOMPSAT-3 (2012): image receiving and processing station, mission control subsystems, and sun sensor
 Gokturk-2 (2012): EO payload
 KOMPSAT-5 (2013): fixed/mobile image receiving and processing station, mission control subsystems, SAR simulator, and sun sensor
 DubaiSat-2 (2013): satellite & ground systems
 Deimos-2 (2013): satellite & ground systems
 KOMPSAT-3A (2015): fixed/mobile image receiving and processing station and sun sensor 
 TeLEOS-1 (2015): EO payload
 Velox-C1 (2015)
 KhalifaSat (2018): electric modules, telescope, and image receiving and processing station
 GEO-KOMPSAT-2A/B (2018/2019): electric modules, space weather sensor, image receiving and processing station, and mission control subsystems

Platforms

SpaceEye-X 
SpaceEye-X is a satellite bus, which was originally designed to carry very high resolution optical payload(<0.5 m resolution). SpaceEye-X provides the capability to accommodate various payloads, including SAR antennas.

SpaceEye-1 
SpaceEye-1 is an improved model and advanced variant of the SI-300 satellite bus, which was the platforms of DubaiSat-2 and DEIMOS-2. Current model is optimized for Earth observation purposes (<1 m resolution).

SpaceEye-W 
SpaceEye-W is a mini-satellite platform (100 kg class). This platform has a very flexible configuration; it can support assorted missions from technical demonstration and science missions to Earth observation missions and telecommunications.

SpaceEye-T 
SpaceEye-T is a 700 kg class satellite platform that will form the basis for SI's own Earth observation satellite constellation. It will offer an optical payload with 30-cm resolution and 12 km swath width. As of August 2021, the first SpaceEye-T satellite is planned for launch in early 2024.

Subsystem-level Products

Electric Propulsion Systems 
SI provides Hall-effect electric propulsion systems (HEPS) optimized for small satellite missions. They provide power processing units, propellant feeding units, and Hall effect thrusters with various power consumption range. HEPS has been acquired flight heritages; DubaiSat-2 and DEIMOS-2 equipped HEPS-200 (200 W power consumption).

Star Tracker 
SI develops and manufactures star trackers that have enormous flight heritages.

Other Products 
 S-band Transceiver
 X-band Transmitter
 Steerable X-band Antenna
 Command & Data Handling Unit
 Solid-state Recorder
 Sun Sensor

References

Manufacturing companies of South Korea
Companies based in Daejeon
South Korean companies established in 1999
Spacecraft manufacturers
Manufacturing companies established in 1999